Batalden may refer to:

20309 Batalden, a main-belt asteroid
Batalden (Vestland), a group of islands in Vestland, Norway
Batalden Chapel, a chapel of the Church of Norway in Vestland, Norway